Masindi General Hospital, also Masindi Government Hospital or Masindi Hospital, is a hospital in the Western Region of Uganda.

Location
The coordinates of Masindi General Hospital are:01°41'07.0"N, 31°42'48.0"E (Latitude:1.685282; Longitude:31.713337).

Overview
The hospital was built in 1922, as a health aid post of the workers of the East African Railways. In 1935, it was acquired by the colonial government and developed into a Health Center IV facility. In 1965 it was handed over to the government of Uganda. In 1988, it was upgraded to a 100-bed general hospital. 54 gynecology beds were added in 2008, to bring the bed capacity to 154. The bed capacity as at January 2013, was given as 160.

Patients served come from the districts of Masindi, Buliisa, Nakasongola, Nakaseke, Hoima and Nebbi. Some patients come from as far away as South Sudan and eastern DR Congo.

See also
List of hospitals in Uganda

References

External links 
 Website of Uganda Ministry of Health

Hospital buildings completed in 1922
1922 establishments in Uganda
Hospitals in Uganda
Masindi District
Bunyoro sub-region
Western Region, Uganda